Leucothoe is a genus of about 6 species of flowering plants in the family Ericaceae, native to Asia and the Americas. Many species have the common name doghobble.
Leucothoe species contain grayanotoxins, a group of closely related neurotoxins named after Leucothoe grayana, native to Japan.

They are shrubs growing to 1–3 m tall, either deciduous or evergreen depending on species. The leaves are alternate, oblong-lanceolate, 2–15 cm long. The flowers are produced in racemes 3–15 cm long, each flower bell-shaped, 4–20 mm long, white or occasionally pink.

Selected species
Leucothoe axillaris (coastal doghobble; southeastern United States)
Leucothoe davisiae (black laurel; Sierra Nevada, northern California & Oregon)
Leucothoe fontanesiana (highland doghobble or drooping leucothoe; southeastern United States)
Leucothoe grayana (Japan)
Leucothoe griffithiana (eastern Himalaya, southwest China)
Leucothoe keiskei (Japan)
Leucothoe populifolia (southeastern United States)
Leucothoe racemosa (swamp doghobble or sweetbells; eastern United States)
Leucothoe recurva (redtwig doghobble; southeastern United States)
Leucothoe tonkinensis (southern China, northern Vietnam)

References

External links
Leucothoe fontanesiana images at bioimages.vanderbilt.edu

Vaccinioideae
Ericaceae genera